ALY or Aly may refer to:

Places
Aly, a rural locality in the Sakha Republic in Russia
Dake Aly, a locality in Mali

Code
 Albany, Oregon (Amtrak station), Oregon, United States; Amtrak station code ALY
 Allahabad City railway station, Uttar Pradesh, India; Indian Railways station code ALY
 Allegheny and Eastern Railroad, United States; reporting mark ALY
 Allegheny Railroad, United States; reporting mark ALY
 Alexandria International Airport (Egypt), Alexandria, Egypt; IATA airport code ALY
 Aly, short for "Alley"; a Street suffix as used in the US

People

Given name
Aly Abeid (born 1997), Mauritanian footballer
Aly Abdel Aziz (born 1947), Egyptian professional squash player
Aly Arriola (born 1989), Honduran footballer
Aly Attyé (born 1964), Senegalese judoka
Aly Bain (born 1946), Shetland fiddler
Aly Camara (born 1986), Guinean association footballer
Aly Cissokho (born 1987), French association footballer of Senegalese descent
Aly Coulibaly (born 1996), French footballer
Aly El Dawoudi (born 1949), Egyptian tennis player
Aly Doerfel (1949–2021), Luxembourgian fencer
Aly El-Shafei, Egyptian academic
Aly Goni (born 1991), Indian actor
Aly González (born 1991), Venezuelan baseball manager
Aly Hassan (born 1989), American soccer player
Aly Hindy, Canadian imam
Aly Jaerling (born 1948), Luxembourgian politician
Aly Keita (born 1986), Guinean footballer
Aly Khan (1911-1960), Aga Khan IV's father
Aly Muhammad Aga Khan (born 2000), Aga Khan IV's son
Aly Knepper (born 1940), Luxembourgian sports shooter
Aly Lotfy Mahmoud (1935-2018), Egyptian politician 
Aly Mallé (born 1998), Malian footballer
Aly Michalka (born 1989), American actress
Aly Monroe, British writer
Aly Morani, Indian film producer
Aly Muldowney (born 1983), English rugby union player
Aly Ndom (born 1996), French footballer
Aly Maher Pasha (1881-1960), Egyptian political figure
Aly Raisman (born 1994), American gymnast
Aly Saad (born 1954), Egyptian professor
Aly Tadros (born 1986), American singer
Aly Wagner (born 1980), American association footballer
Aly Yirango (born 1994), Malian footballer
Aly Zaker (born 1944), Bangladeshi actor

Surname
Abdoulatifou Aly (born 1960), French politician from Mayotte
Amir Aly, Swedish songwriter and record producer
Amr Aly (born 1962), American association footballer
Götz Aly (born 1947), German journalist and historian
Hassan Aly, politician from Madagascar
Mohamed Aly (boxer) (born 1975), Egyptian boxer
Waleed Aly, Australian academic and television presenter

See also 
Ally (disambiguation)
Ali (disambiguation)
Alloy
Alley